Harnahal Singh Sewa (born 29 October 1946) is a Malaysian field hockey player. He competed at the 1968 Summer Olympics and the 1972 Summer Olympics.

References

External links
 

1946 births
Living people
Malaysian people of Punjabi descent
Malaysian sportspeople of Indian descent
Malaysian male field hockey players
Olympic field hockey players of Malaysia
Field hockey players at the 1968 Summer Olympics
Field hockey players at the 1972 Summer Olympics
Place of birth missing (living people)